Naniz-e Olya (also Romanized as Nanīz-e ‘Olyā; also known as Nanīz Bālā, Nanīz-e Bālā, and Nanūk-e Bālā) is a village in Siyah Banuiyeh Rural District, in the Central District of Rabor County, Kerman Province, Iran. At the 2006 census, its population was 778, in 195 families.

References 

Populated places in Rabor County